Ribert and Robert's Wonderworld is a children's educational television series that is part animated, part live action. It was created by Mike DeVitto.  As of May 2007, the series airs on over 120 public television stations in North America.

Premise
The series revolves around Ribert, a young animated toad that wears a cap & later a safety helmet, who wants to know "everything", and Robert, his human friend, as they spend each episode learning about different topics against the backdrop of a magical island amusement park, known as WonderWorld.  The show's tagline is: The first show a kid can ride!

Episode Format
Each episode follows a general format, concentrating on a single topic. Ribert is curious by nature, and he "wants to know everything", according to the song he sings at the start of each episode.  Robert, a human, is his best friend and partner.  He's the one who pilots the roller coaster car Ribert and his viewers (known as Power Pals) ride as they learn about the day's topic.

Ribert tells Robert what he wants to learn about that day.  Subjects have included birthdays, dinosaurs, "being safe" and "being a good friend".  Robert powers up the roller coaster car and Ribert (along with the Power Pals), put on their safety helmets as the journey begins.

The goal of each episode is to solve three "challenges" as the roller coaster car travels the track in the Wonderworld amusement park.  Three times over the course of the episode, Robert asks the Power Pals a question, and once it's answered correctly, the Power Pals are given a "magic key", which is a key with a human face painted in it, and the respective keys are called in order Jen, Lee and Tiffany.  Ribert asks each "magic key" to open a door for him, and everyone is treated to a visit by human "friends", who perform a skit or task describing the day's subject matter.  One of the doors is usually occupied by Cousin Chris, who draws a picture related to the day's topic.  After each presentation, Ribert and Robert discuss it together before the roller coaster car moves to the next challenge.

After all three "magic keys" are obtained, a "secret word" is revealed that is in line with the day's subject.  Clues to the "secret word" are provided to the Power Pals during the course of the episode.  Upon the completion of the mission, Ribert and Robert say goodbye to the Power Pals with a song.

Episode Descriptions

Season 1 (2005)

Season 2 (2005-2006)

Season 3 (2006-2007)

Season 4 (2007-2008)

Season 5 (2008)

Cast and Principal Crew

Ribert - voiced by Jessikah Lopez
Robert - James Bondy
Cousin Chris - Chris Allard
Magic Matt (magician) - Matt Roberts
Dara Duck - Dara Bourne
Leeny (the story performer) - Leeny Del Seamonds
Vanessa (dance partner) - Vanessa Logan
Joan and Friends - Joan Kennedy, Jeffery McIlwain, Con Fullam, Grace Katherine Stacey
Professor Expound - Mark Scalia
Erin (the game girl) - Erin Horne
Kids' Voices - Luis Branco, Jr., Rachel Estremera and Nicole Branco
Nonni-CJ Gagliola Hughes
Created, Produced and Directed by Mike DeVitto
Written by Mike DeVitto and Jenn DeVitto
Executive Producers - Mike DeVitto, Con Fullam and Greg Gormican
Music and Sound - Michael McInnis
Live-Action Supervision - Jamie Norton and Mike DeVitto
Technical Director - Jim Grotto
Animation Director - Jamie Norton and Melissa Napier
Creative Director - Chris Allard
Design and Support - Dick Campbell and Dennis Gilbert
Sound recorded at Michael McInnis Productions, Portland, Maine
Songs by Paul Conway Fullam and Michael McInnis
Presented by Deos Animation Studios and American Public Television

External links
American Public Television website

2000s American animated television series
2000s American children's television series
2000s preschool education television series
2006 American television series debuts
2007 American television series endings
American children's animated fantasy television series
American computer-animated television series
American preschool education television series
American television series with live action and animation
Animated preschool education television series
Animated television series about frogs
PBS Kids shows
PBS original programming
Personal development television series